Crossgreen is a hamlet in Shropshire, England.

It is situated on the B5067, Shrewsbury to Baschurch road, in the parish of Pimhill, between Shrewsbury and the small village of Leaton.

External links

Villages in Shropshire